Dambiinyamyn Maralgerel (born 27 March 1972) is a Mongolian judoka. He competed in the men's half-lightweight event at the 1992 Summer Olympics.

References

External links
 

1972 births
Living people
Mongolian male judoka
Olympic judoka of Mongolia
Judoka at the 1992 Summer Olympics
Place of birth missing (living people)